The following lists events that happened during 2010 in the Democratic Republic of the Congo.

Incumbents 
 President: Joseph Kabila
 Prime Minister: Adolphe Muzito

Events

January
 January 3 - Mount Nyamuragira erupts, threatening rare wildlife in the Virunga National Park.

References

 
Years of the 21st century in the Democratic Republic of the Congo
Democratic Republic of the Congo
2010s in the Democratic Republic of the Congo
Democratic Republic of the Congo